Constantino Kapambwe (born 21 July 1940) is a former long-distance runner. He competed in the marathon at the 1964 Summer Olympics representing Northern Rhodesia.

References

1940 births
Living people
Athletes (track and field) at the 1964 Summer Olympics
Zambian male long-distance runners
Zambian male marathon runners
Olympic athletes of Northern Rhodesia
Place of birth missing (living people)